George McKinley Treadwell (December 21, 1918 in New Rochelle, New York – May 14, 1967 in New York City) was an American jazz trumpeter and the manager of the Drifters.

Treadwell played in the house band at Monroe's in Harlem in 1941–1942, then worked with Benny Carter later in 1942 in Florida. Following stints with Ace Harris's Sunset Royals and Tiny Bradshaw, Treadwell worked with Cootie Williams (1943–1946) and J.C. Heard (1946–1947). As a member of Heard's ensemble, he accompanied Etta Jones and Sarah Vaughan, whom he married in 1947. He also recorded with Dicky Wells and Ethel Waters in 1946.

Treadwell quit playing late in the 1940s to work as Vaughan's manager, and continued in this capacity after their divorce in 1957. He also managed the Drifters and Ruth Brown and did artists and repertoire (A&R) work in the 1950s.

Treadwell met Fayrene Johnson in Los Angeles and they married in 1957.

After 1959 Treadwell also worked as a songwriter.

In 1967, Treadwell died suddenly, leaving his wife Faye to buy out his partners and manage The Drifters.

References

Howard Rye, "George Treadwell". Grove Jazz online.

1918 births
1967 deaths
American jazz trumpeters
American male trumpeters
Musicians from New Rochelle, New York
American music managers
The Drifters
Songwriters from New York (state)
Jazz musicians from New York (state)
American male jazz musicians
20th-century American male musicians